Rainbow High may refer to:

Rainbow High (book), by Alex Sanchez, 2003
Rainbow High (dolls), a line of dolls introduced in 2020
Rainbow High School, Gaborone, Botswana
"Rainbow High", a song from the Andrew Lloyd Webber musical Evita